The Semmering Base Tunnel is a railway tunnel under construction between Gloggnitz and Mürzzuschlag in Austria underneath the Semmering Pass. The existing route is 41 km in length and the Semmering Base Tunnel will be 27.3 km in length.  The new route will offer time savings of up to 30 minutes, partly on account of the shorter route and partly on account of the higher speed limit (maximum 250 km/h).

Construction began on 25 April 2012 and the link is expected to enter operational service in 2030, delayed from the original estimate of 2026. The main benefit of the new tunnel will be increased ease of use for freight traffic. The gradients of the traditional routes requires the use of two locomotives; the reduced gradient of the new link will enable the transit of freight traffic using just one locomotive. The Semmering Base Tunnel and the Koralm Railway in combination will enable freight transit across the whole southern line with just one locomotive.

Currently, the fastest Vienna-Graz and Vienna-Klagenfurt journeys on the Railjet services are 2 hours 35 minutes and 3 hours 55 minutes, respectively. If the Koralmbahn enables Graz-Klagenfurt journeys of approximately 1 hour, it will bring Vienna-Klagenfurt journeys down to 3 hours 35 minutes, a saving of 20 minutes. The Semmering Base Tunnel is projected to enable time savings of 35 minutes, which will enable journeys from Vienna to Graz and Klagenfurt of two and three hours respectively.

History

Background
The Semmering railway, which was constructed between 1848 and 1854, holds the distinction of being the first railway to traverse the Alps, and has been commonly referred to as the world's first true mountain railway. The historic significance of this traditional route is such that it has been declared a World Heritage Site by UNESCO. By the turn of the 21st century, a total of 70,000 goods and passenger trains were reportedly being run through the Semmering railway during each year, it is one of the busiest routes in Austria.

In order to relieve pressure upon the original route, interest grew in the development of a more direct route over the Alps. These notions soon centered around the concept of boring a base tunnel at a significantly lower altitude. During 2006, a two-year route selection process was conducted; in April 2008, it was announced that the southernmost route had been determined to be the optimum of those studied. During the later half of 2009, the final route for the proposed Semmering Base Tunnel was selected; this ran between Gloggnitz and the Mürzzuschlag-Langenwang area.

Specifically, the proposed tunnel comprises twin-parallel bores, each possessing a diameter of 10 meters and separated by up to 70 meters; for safety reasons, connecting pedestrian passages between the two bores are to occur at regular intervals of up to 500 meters. This base tunnel, if built, is planned to enable trains to traverse the new route at a speed of up to 250 km/h. Being significantly faster than the Semmering line, it would enable a reduction in the travel time between the cities of Vienna and Graz.

The proposed base tunnel is intentionally designed with a shallow inclination, a gradient of 0.85 per cent. This gradient was selected to enable it to be used by heavy freight trains with only a single locomotive. The plan involves several infrastructure changes, such as the integration of the railway stations at Gloggnitz and Mürzzuschlag with the proposed route. Outside of railway infrastructure, a flood protection scheme is required to mitigate against the risk posed by the nearby River Schwarza while the relocation of the  road would also be necessary.

Contractors
The primary contracts for the construction of the Semmering Base Tunnel is divided into three contract sections. During 2014, the contract for the construction of the 13 km-long central section of the tunnel, valued at approximately €623 million ($827 million), was awarded to a consortium of Implenia and Swietelsky. A separate contract was awarded to Amberg Engineering for it to conduct tunnel excavation works, while Strabag was engaged to conduct drilling activities. During 2010, BGG Consult was awarded a contract to provide geotechnical and hydrogeological consulting services during both the tendering and construction phases of the programme.

The Austrian Federal Railways contracted the planning of the proposed Semmering Base Tunnel's route to a consortium of Werner Consult and Witrisal consortium to conduct the route planning for the tunnel. Separately, Gruner AG was also involved in the design for the new twin-tube tunnels; this work included its aerodynamics and environmental control, including operational and emergency ventilation systems. Soil mechanical and geotechnical consulting services at the intermediate sites at Fröschnitzgraben and Grautschenhof by INSITU Geotechnics.

Construction
During 2012, preparatory ground works for the Semmering Base Tunnel commenced. On 7 January 2014, construction began upon the tunnel's central section. Work on this section involved boring work along a length of 8.6 km, while a drill-and-blast method for the remaining 4.3 km section. The central section is to consist of 26 crossover passages between the two tunnels, along with an emergency station; a pair of 400 metre-deep ventilation shafts are also to be dug. By 7 June 2016, work on the third section of the Summering Base Tunnel had commenced; this meant that full-rate construction activity upon the project, which was reportedly costed at €3.3 billion as of this point in time, was now underway.

To facilitate the construction work, three intermediate sites were established near to Göstritz, Fröschnitzgraben and Grautschenhof. At Göstritz, a 1,000 metre access gallery and multiple 250 metre-deep shafts were constructed to facilitate conventional tunnel excavation methods. At Fröschnitzgraben, a pair of 400 metre-deep shafts, possessing a diameter of 22 metres, were dug ahead of the deployment of tunnel boring machines. Once assembled, these will be used to create the bore towards Gloggnitz.  Breakthrough of this section occurred on 10 June 2022.

Additional major works will include the construction of entrances in Gloggnitz and Mürzzuschlag, as well as ventilation shafts at Trattenbach and Sommerau. Substations located at Gloggnitz and Langenwang are intended to be used to supply electricity to the trains that'll run through the Semmering base tunnel. Beyond the tunnel itself, ancillary work involves the construction of two new railway bridges, as well as a new road bridge and an underpass for the B27.

Owing to encountering difficulties with the complex geology in the area, including the fault zone being traversed during construction and different rock types, an additional cost of €390 million was added taking the total cost to €3.9 billion, with measures to mitigate these risks in 2021 being unsuccessful.

References

Base tunnels
Railway tunnels in Austria
Transport infrastructure under construction
2027 in rail transport